This is a list of individual National Collegiate Athletic Association (NCAA) American football records, including Division I (FBS, and FCS), II, and III.

Total offense

Yards per game, season

 FBS: 474.6 – David Klingler, Houston, 1990, 11 games
 FCS: 527.2 – Steve McNair, Alcorn State, 1994, 11 games
 Div II: 436.7 – J. J. Harp, Eastern New Mexico, 2009, 10 games
 Div III: 465.1 – Justin Peery, Westminster (MO), 1998, 10 games

Career yards

 FBS: 20,114 – Case Keenum, Houston, 2007–11, 19,217 passing, 897 rushing
 FCS: 16,823 – Steve McNair, Alcorn State, 1991–94, 14,496 passing, 2,327 rushing
 Div II: 16,432 – Bo Cordell, Tusculum, 2009–13, 16,265 passing, 167 rushing
 Div III: 14,568 – Kevin Burke, Mount Union, 2011–14, 12,087 passing, 2,481 rushing

Season yards

 FBS: 6,040 – Joe Burrow, LSU, 2019, 5671 passing, 369 rushing
 FCS: 5,799 – Steve McNair, Alcorn State, 1994, 4,863 passing, 936 rushing
 Div II: 5,363 – Chad Friehauf, Colorado Mines, 2004, 4,646 passing, 717 rushing

Single game yards

 FBS: 819 – Patrick Mahomes, Texas Tech vs. Oklahoma, Oct. 22, 2016, 734 passing, 85 rushing
 FCS: 791 – Taylor Heinicke, Old Dominion vs. New Hampshire, Sep. 22, 2012, 730 passing, 61 rushing
 Div II: 681 – J. J. Harp, Eastern New Mexico vs. Southeastern Oklahoma, Sep. 12, 2009, 695 passing, −14 rushing
 Div III: 719 – Sam Durley, Eureka vs. Knox, Sep. 1, 2012, 736 passing, −17 rushing

Most games gaining 400 yards or more, season

 FBS: 11 – B. J. Symons, Texas Tech, 2003
 FCS: 9 – 
 Div II:
 Div III:

Most games gaining 400 yards or more, career

 FBS: 21 – Case Keenum, Houston, 2007–11; Graham Harrell, Texas Tech, 2006–08
 FCS: 15 – Steve McNair, Alcorn State, 1991–94
 Div II:
 Div III:

Rushing

Most rushing attempts, career
 FBS: 1,215 – Steve Bartalo, Colorado State, 1983–86, 4,813 yards
 FCS: 1,240 – Jordan Scott, Colgate, 2005–08, 5,621 yards
 Div II: 1,271 – Xavier Omon, Northwest Missouri State, 2004–07, 7,073 yards
 DIV III: 1,324 – Levell Coppage, Wisconsin–Whitewater, 2008–11, 7,795 yards

Most rushing attempts, season
 FBS: 450 – Kevin Smith, UCF, 2007, 2,567 yards
 FCS: 450 – Jamaal Branch, Colgate, 2003, 2,326 yards
 Div II: 385 – Joe Gough, Wayne State (MI), 1994, 1,593 yards
 Div III: 463 – Dante Washington, Carthage, 2004, 1990 yards

Most rushing attempts, game
 FBS: 58 – Tony Sands, Kansas vs. Missouri, Nov. 23, 1991, 396 yards
 FCS: 56 – Arnold Mickens, Butler vs. Valparaiso, Oct. 8, 1994, 295 yards
 Div II: 62 – Rahmann Lee, Glenville vs. WVWC, Sep. 10, 2015, 412 yards
 Div III: 59 – John Ortiz, King's (PA) vs. Albright, Sep. 24, 2005, 267 yards

Highest average rushing attempts per game, season
 FBS:
 FCS:
 Div II: 38.6 - Mark Perkins, Hobart College, 1968, 309 carries in 8 games
 Div III:

Most consecutive rushing attempts without losing a fumble, career
 FBS: 1,005 – Mike Hart, Michigan, 2004–08
 FCS:
 Div II:
 Div III:

Most consecutive rushing attempts without losing a fumble, season
 FBS: 365 – Travis Prentice, Miami (OH), 1998
 FCS:
 Div II:
 Div III:

Highest average rushing yards per game, career (minimum 2,500 yards)
 FBS: 174.6 – Ed Marinaro, Cornell, 1969–71, 4,715 yards in 27 games
 FCS: 190.7 – Arnold Mickens, Butler, 1994–95, 3,813 in 20
 Div II: 183.4 – Anthony Gray, Western New Mexico, 1997–98, 3,484 in 19
 Div III: 187.1 – Tony Sutton, Wooster, 2002–04, 5,613 in 30

Highest average rushing yards per game, season
 FBS: 238.9 – Barry Sanders, Oklahoma State, 1988, 2,628 yards in 11 games
 FCS: 225.5 – Arnold Mickens, Butler, 1994, 2,255 in 10
 Div II: 222.0 – Anthony Gray, Western New Mexico, 1997, 2,220 in 10
 Div III: 238.5 – Dante Brown, Marietta, 1996, 2,385 in 10

Most yards rushing, career
 FBS: 7,125 – Ron Dayne, University of Wisconsin, 1996–99, 1220 rushes
 FCS: 7,590 – Adrian Peterson, Georgia Southern University, 1998–2001, 996 rushes (Note: Not the same Adrian Peterson who played for University of Oklahoma)
 Div II: 7,962 – Danny Woodhead, Chadron State, 2004–07, 1,156 rushes
 Div III: 8,074 – Nate Kmic, Mount Union, 2005–08, 1,189 rushes

Most yards rushing, season
 FBS: 2,628 – Barry Sanders, Oklahoma State, 1988, 344 rushes, 11 games
 FCS: 2,519 – Terrance West, Towson, 2013, 413 rushes, 16 games
 Div II: 2,756 – Danny Woodhead, Chadron State, 2006, 344 rushes
 Div III: 2,790 – Nate Kmic, Mount Union, 2008, 377 rushes

Most yards rushing, game
 FBS: 427 – Samaje Perine, Oklahoma vs. Kansas, Nov. 22, 2014, 34 carries
 FCS: 437 – Maurice Hicks, North Carolina A&T vs. Morgan State, Oct. 6, 2001, 34 rushes
 Div II: 425 – Connor Silveria, South Dakota School of Mines vs. Adams State, Oct. 13,2018, 46 rushes
 Div III: 465 – Cartel Brooks, Heidelberg vs. Baldwin Wallace, Nov. 16, 2013, 38 rushes

Most yards rushing by two players, same team, game
 FBS: 544 – Michael Carter 308 (24 carries) and Javonte Williams 236 (23 carries), North Carolina vs Miami, FL December 12, 2020 
 FCS:
 Div II:
 Div III:

Most rushing yards by a quarterback, career
 FBS: 4,559 – Keenan Reynolds, Navy, 2012–15, 977 rushes
 FCS: 4,852 – Matt Cannon, Southern Utah, 1997–2000, 674 rushes
 Div II: 5,953 – Jason Vander Laan, Ferris State, 2012–15, 1010 rushes
 Div III: 4,242 – Ayrton Scott, Augsburg, 2012–15, 722 rushes

Most rushing yards by a quarterback, season
 FBS: 2,017 – Malcolm Perry, Navy, 2019, 295 rushes
 FCS: 1,844 – Jayson Foster, Georgia Southern, 2007, 261 rushes
 Div II: 1,607 – Jason Vander Laan, Ferris State, 2013, 265 rushes
 Div III: 1,941 – Chris Sharpe, Springfield, 2006, 261 rushes

Most rushing yards by a quarterback, game
 FBS: 327 – Khalil Tate, Arizona vs. Colorado, Oct. 7, 2017, 14 rushes
 FCS: 316 – Jerick McKinnon, Georgia Southern vs. Central Arkansas, Dec. 1, 2012, 34 rushes
 Div II: 323 – Shawn Graves, Wofford vs. Lenoir–Rhyne, Sep. 15, 1990, 23 rushes
 Div III: 342 – Matt Roe, Augustana (IL) vs. Wheaton (IL), Nov. 13, 2004, 44 rushes

Most rushing touchdowns, career

 FBS: 88 – Keenan Reynolds, Navy, 2012–15
 FCS: 84 – Adrian Peterson, Georgia Southern, 1998–2001
 Div II: 107 – Germaine Race, Pittsburg State, 2003–06
 Div III: 125 – Nate Kmic, Mount Union, 2005–08

Most rushing touchdowns, season
 FBS: 39 – Barry Sanders, Oklahoma State, 1988, 11 games and Montee Ball, Wisconsin, 2011, 14 games
FCS: 41 – Terrance West, Towson, 2013, 16 games
Div III: 44 - Nate Kmic, Mount Union, 2008, 15 games

Most rushing touchdowns, game 
FBS: 8 – Howard Griffith, Illinois, 1990; Kalen Ballage, Arizona State, 2016; Jaret Patterson, Buffalo, 2020
FCS: 7 – Archie Amerson, Northern Arizona, 1996
Div II: 8 – Junior Wolf, Oklahoma Panhandle State, 1958
Div III: 8 –  Donavan Henderson, Manchester, 2019; Carey Bender, Coe, 1994

Most rushing touchdowns by a quarterback, career
 FBS: 88 – Keenan Reynolds, Navy, 2012–15 
 FCS: 69 – Matt Cannon, Southern Utah, 1997-2000
 Div II: 81 – Jason Vander Laan, Ferris State, 2012–15
 Div III: 70 – Chris Sharpe, Springfield, 2004–06

Most rushing touchdowns by a quarterback, season
 FBS: 31 – Keenan Reynolds, Navy, 2013
 FCS: 27 – Chaz Williams, Georgia Southern, 2002
 Div II: 24 – Shawn Graves, Wofford, 1989; Jason Vander Laan, Ferris State, 2015
 Div III: 35 – Chris Sharpe, Springfield, 2006, 12 games

Most rushing touchdowns by a quarterback, game
 FBS: 7 – Keenan Reynolds, Navy vs. San Jose State, Nov 22, 2013
 FCS: 
 Div II: 
 Div III: 7 – Chris Sharpe, Springfield, vs. St. John Fisher, October 11, 2006

Most games with 100+ rushing yards, career
 FBS: 34 – DeAngelo Williams, Memphis, 2002–05
 FCS:  40 – Adrian Peterson, Georgia Southern, 1998–2001
 Div III: 42 – Levell Coppage, Wisconsin–Whitewater, 2008–11

Most games with a touchdown, career
 FBS: 46 – Travis Etienne Jr, Clemson, 2017–20
 FCS:  
 Div II:
 Div III:

Passing

Highest passing efficiency rating, career
 FBS: 199.4 – Tua Tagovailoa, Alabama, 2017–19 (min. 325 completions)
 FCS: 176.7 – Josh Johnson, San Diego, 2004–07 (min. 300 completions)
 Div II: 190.8 – Dusty Bonner, Valdosta State, 2000–01 (min. 375 completions)
 Div III: 197.4 – Greg Micheli, Mount Union, 2005–08 (min. 325 completions)

Highest passing efficiency rating, season (min. 15 attempts per team game)
 FBS: 207.6 – Grayson McCall, Coastal Carolina, 2021
 FCS: 204.6 – Shawn Knight, William & Mary, 1993
 Div II: 210.1 – Boyd Crawford, Albertson, 1953
 Div III: 225.0 – Mike Simpson, Eureka, 1994

Highest passing efficiency rating, game 
 FBS: 403.4 – Tim Clifford, Indiana vs Colorado, 1980 (min. 12 attempts); 317.4 – Bruce Gradkowski, Toledo vs Buffalo, 2003 (min. 25 attempts); 248.0 – Geno Smith, West Virginia vs Baylor, 2012 (min. 50 attempts)
 FCS: 409.9 – Taryn Christion, South Dakota State vs Arkansas Pine-Bluff, 2018 (min. 15 attempts)
 Div II:
 Div III:

Highest percentage of passes completed, game
 FBS: 90.6% – Seth Doege, Texas Tech vs. New Mexico, Sep. 17, 2011 (min. 40 completions); 93.9% – Kyle Allen, Houston vs. Rice, Sep. 16, 2017 (min. 30 completions); 96.0% – Greyson Lambert, Georgia vs. South Carolina, Sep. 18, 2015 (min. 20 completions)
 FCS: 88.9% – Richie Williams, Appalachian State vs. Furman, Oct. 9, 2004 (min. 30 completions); 96.2% – Ricky Santos, New Hampshire vs. Northeastern, Oct. 22, 2005 (min. 20 completions)
 Div II: 90.0% – Lance Parker, Ouachita Baptist vs. Southwest Baptist, Oct. 25, 2008 (min. 35 completions); 96.0% – Zack Eskridge, Midwestern State vs. Texas A&M–Kingsville, Oct. 17, 2009 (min. 20 completions)
 Div III: 84.9% – Ian Kolste, Whitworth vs. George Fox, Oct. 1, 2016 (min. 35 completions); 95.5% – Mark Petruziello, John Carroll vs. Thomas More, Sep. 6, 2008 (min. 20 completions)

Highest percentage of passes completed, career
 FBS: 70.4% – Colt Brennan, Hawaii, 2005–07 (minimum 875 attempts)
 FCS: 69.6% – Eric Sanders, Northern Iowa, 2004–07 (minimum 750 attempts)
 Div II: 72.7% – Dusty Bonner, Valdosta State, 2000–01 (minimum 500 attempts)
 Div III: 74.1% – Greg Micheli, Mount Union, 2005–08 (minimum 750 attempts)

Highest percentage of passes completed, season
 FBS: 77.4% – Mac Jones, Alabama, 2020 (minimum 150 attempts)
 FCS: 75.2% – Eric Sanders, Northern Iowa, 2007 (minimum 200 attempts)
 Div II: 76.9% – Troy Weatherhead, Hillsdale, 2010 (minimum 250 attempts)
 Div III: 75.0% – Greg Micheli, Mount Union, 2008 (minimum 250 attempts)

Most yards passing, career
 FBS: 19,217 – Case Keenum, Houston, 2007–11
 FCS: 14,584 – Devlin Hodges, Samford, 2015–18
 Div II: 16,265 – Bo Cordell, Tusculum, 2009–13
 Div III: 14,249 – Alex Tanney, Monmouth (IL), 2007–11

Most yards passing, season
 FBS: 5,967 – Bailey Zappe, Western Kentucky, 2021
FBS: 5,671 - Joe Burrow, LSU 2019
 FCS: 5,076 – Taylor Heinicke, Old Dominion, 2012
 Div II: 5,207 – Eric Czerniewski, Central Missouri, 2010
 Div III: 5,068 – Joe Callahan, Wesley, 2015

Most yards passing, game
 FBS: 734 – Connor Halliday, Washington State vs Cal, Oct. 4, 2014; Patrick Mahomes, Texas Tech vs Oklahoma, Oct. 22, 2016
 FCS: 730 – Taylor Heinicke, Old Dominion vs. New Hampshire, Sep. 22, 2012
 Div II: 695 – J. J. Harp, Eastern New Mexico vs. Southeastern Oklahoma, Sep. 12, 2009
 Div III: 736 – Sam Durley, Eureka vs. Knox (IL), Sep. 1, 2012

Most yards passing, quarter
 FBS: 340 - Andre Ware, Houston, 1989

Most yards passing, half
 FBS: 517 - Andre Ware, Houston, 1989

Most yards passing per game, season
 FBS: 467.3 – David Klingler, Houston, 1990
 FCS: 455.7 – Willie Totten, Mississippi Valley, 1984
 Div II: 437.3 – J. J. Harp, Eastern New Mexico, 2009
 Div III: 450.1 – Justin Peery, Westminster (MO), 1998

Most passes attempted, career
 FBS: 2,436 – Timmy Chang, Hawaii, 2000–04
 FCS: 1,896 – Devlin Hodges, Samford, 2015–18
 Div II: 2,187 – Bo Cordell, Tusculum, 2009–13
 Div III: 1,982 – Josh Vogelbach, Guilford, 2005–08

Most passes attempted, season
 FBS: 719 – B. J. Symons, Texas Tech, 2003
 FCS: 598 – Jeremy Moses, Stephen F. Austin, 2008
 Div II: 670 – Eric Czerniewski, Central Missouri, 2010
 Div III: 575 – Brett Dietz, Hanover, 2003

Most passes attempted, game
 FBS: 89 – Connor Halliday, Washington State vs. Oregon, October 19, 2013
 FCS: 85 – Jeremy Moses, Stephen F. Austin vs. Sam Houston State, Nov. 1, 2008
 Div II: 94 – J. J. Harp, Eastern New Mexico vs. Southeastern Oklahoma, Sep. 12, 2009
 Div III: 84 – Evan Jones, Carthage vs. North Central (IL), Oct. 17, 2009; Mackenzie McGrady, Alma vs. Wisconsin–River Falls, Sep. 26, 2009; McCallum Foote, Middlebury vs. Amherst, Oct. 5, 2013

Most passes completed, career
 FBS: 1,546 – Case Keenum, Houston, 2007–11
 FCS: 1,310 –  Devlin Hodges, Samford, 2015–18
 Div II: 1,397 – Bo Cordell, Tusculum, 2009–13
 Div III: 1,205 – Alex Tanney, Monmouth (IL), 2007–11

Most passes completed, season
 FBS: 512 – Graham Harrell, Texas Tech, 2007
 FCS: 385 – Jeremy Moses, Stephen F. Austin, 2009; Brett Gordon, Villanova, 2002 
 Div II: 447 – Eric Czerniewski, Central Missouri, 2010
 Div III: 360 – Brett Dietz, Hanover, 2003

Most passes completed, game
 FBS: 58 – Andy Schmitt, Eastern Michigan vs. Central Michigan, Nov. 28, 2008; Connor Halliday, Washington State vs. Oregon, Oct. 19, 2013
 FCS: 57 – Jeremy Moses, Stephen F. Austin vs. Sam Houston State, Nov. 1, 2008
 Div II: 64 – J. J. Harp, Eastern New Mexico vs. Southeastern Oklahoma, Sep. 12, 2009
 Div III: 58 – Bryan Peterson, Whitworth vs. La Verne, Sep. 20, 2014

Most passes completed per game, career
 FBS: 31.2 – Graham Harrell, Texas Tech, 2005–08
 FCS: 29.8 – Devlin Hodges, Samford, 2015–18
 Div II: 30.4 – Bo Cordell, Tusculum, 2009–13 
 Div III: 29.7 – Josh Vogelbach, Guilford, 2005–08

Most passes completed per game, season
 FBS: 39.4 – Graham Harrell, Texas Tech, 2007
 FCS: 32.4 – Willie Totten, Mississippi Valley, 1984
 Div II: 40.4 – J. J. Harp, Eastern New Mexico, 2009
 Div III: 34.0 – Bryan Peterson, Whitworth University (WA), 2014

Most touchdown passes, career
 FBS: 155 – Case Keenum, Houston, 2007–11
 FCS: 140 – Bruce Eugene, Grambling State, 2001–05
 Div II: 158 – Tyson Bagent, Shepherd, 2018–22
 Div III: 157 – Alex Tanney, Monmouth (IL), 2007–11

Most touchdown passes, season
 FBS: 62 – Bailey Zappe, Western Kentucky, 2021
 FCS: 60 – Lindsey Scott Jr., Incarnate Word, 2022 
 Div II: 54 – Dusty Bonner, Valdosta State, 2000; Zach Zulli, Shippensburg, 2012
 Div III: 63 - Blaine Hawkins, Central (IA), 2021

Most touchdown passes, game
 FBS: 11 – David Klingler, Houston vs. Eastern Washington, Nov. 17, 1990
 FCS: 10 – Ren Hefley, Presbyterian vs. St. Andrews, September 4, 2021
 Div II: 10 – Bruce Swanson, North Park vs. North Central (IL), Oct. 12, 1968
 Div III: 9 – Joe Zarlinga, Ohio Northern vs. Capital, Nov. 14, 1998
Chaiten Tomlin Mount St Joseph vs. Anderson Oct.21, 2017

Most consecutive games throwing touchdown pass
 FBS: 46 - Rakeem Cato, Marshall, 2011–14
 FCS: 42 – Dominic Randolph, Holy Cross, 2006–09
 Div II: 46 – Mike Reilly, Central Washington, 2005–08
 Div III: 40 – Bill Borchert, Mount Union, 1994–97

Most passes intercepted, career
 FBS: 80 – Timmy Chang, Hawaii, 2000–04
 FCS: 75 – Willie Totten, Mississippi Valley, 1982–85
 Div II: 88 – Bob McLaughlin, Lock Haven, 1992–95
 Div III: 117 – Steve Hendry, Wisconsin–Superior, 1980–83

Most passes intercepted, season
 FBS: 34 – John Eckman, Wichita State, 1966
 FCS: 29 – Willie Totten, Mississippi Valley, 1985
 Div II: 32 – Joe Stetser, Chico State, 1967
 Div III: 43 – Steve Hendry, Wisconsin–Superior, 1982

Most passes intercepted, game
 FBS: 9 – John Reaves, Florida vs. Auburn, Nov. 1, 1969
 FCS: 7 – Dan Crowley, Towson vs. Maine, Nov. 16, 1991; Carlton Jenkins, Mississippi Valley vs. Prairie View, Oct. 31, 1987; Charles Hebert, Southeastern Louisiana vs. Northwestern State, Nov. 12, 1983; Mick Spoon, Idaho State vs. Montana, Oct. 21, 1978
 Div II: 9 – Pat Brennan, Franklin vs. Saginaw Valley, Sep. 24, 1983; Henry Schafer, Johns Hopkins vs. Haverford, Oct. 16, 1965
 Div III: 8 – Jason Clark, Ohio Northern vs. John Carroll, Nov. 9, 1991; Jim Higgins, Brockport vs. Buffalo State, Sep. 29, 1990; Dennis Bogacz, Wisconsin–Oshkosh vs. Wisconsin–Stevens Point, Oct. 29, 1988; Kevin Karwath, Canisius vs. Liberty, Nov. 19, 1979

Most pass attempts without an interception, game
 FBS: 77 – David Piland, Houston vs. Louisiana Tech, Sep. 8, 2012
 FCS: 79 – Taylor Heinicke, Old Dominion vs. New Hampshire, Sep. 22, 2012
 Div II: 74 – Michael Pierce, St. Anselm vs. Stonehill, Oct. 24, 2009
 Div III: 82 – Bryan Peterson, Whitworth (WA) vs. LaVerne, Sep. 20, 2014

Most consecutive pass attempts without an interception
 FBS: 444 – Colby Cameron, Louisiana Tech, 2011–12
 FCS: 342 – Jimmy Blanchard, Portland State, 1999
 Div II: 280 – Jesse Showerda, New Haven, 1996
 Div III: 305 – Brad Boyle, Coe, 2009

Lowest percentage of passes intercepted, career
 FBS: 1.20% – Marcus Mariota, Oregon, 2012–14 (min. 600 attempts)
 FCS: 1.41% – Josh Johnson, San Diego, 2004–07 (min. 750 attempts)
 Div II: 1.29% – Malik Grove, Notre Dame College, 2014-2017 (min. 1,000 attempts)
 Div III: 1.15% – Greg Micheli, Mount Union, 2005–08 (min. 750 attempts); 1.47% – Bobby Swallow, Washington & Jefferson, 2005–08 (min. 1,000 attempts)

Lowest percentage of passes intercepted, season
 FBS: 0.0% – Matt Blundin, Virginia, 1991 (150–349 attempts); 0.70% – Kellen Moore, Boise State, 2009 (min. 350 attempts)
 FCS: 0.00% – Trey Lance, North Dakota State, 2019 (150–349 attempts); 0.78% – Pat Devlin, Delaware, 2010 (min. 350 attempts)
 Div II: 0.32% – Billy Cundiff, Ashland, 2009 (min. 300 attempts)
 Div III: 0.2% – Matt Behrendt, Wisconsin–Whitewater, 2013 (min. 150 attempts)

Most consecutive completions in a single game
 FBS: 26 – Dominique Davis, East Carolina vs. Navy, Oct. 22, 2011
 FCS: 29 – Quinn Epperly, Princeton vs. Cornell, Nov. 2, 2013
 Div II: 20 – Scott Buisson, Arkansas–Monticello vs. Henderson State, Sep. 22, 2008; Todd Cunningham, Presbyterian vs. Wingate, Oct. 20, 1999; Chris Hatcher, Valdosta State vs. New Haven, Oct. 8, 1994; Rod Bockwoldt, Weber State vs. South Dakota State, Nov. 6, 1976
 Div III: 21 – Chris Edwards, Washington & Jefferson vs. Allegheny, Sep. 17, 2005

Most consecutive completions in one or more games
 FBS: 36 – Dominique Davis, East Carolina, last 10 attempts vs. Memphis, Oct. 15, 2011 and first 26 vs. Navy, Oct. 22, 2011
 FCS: Same as record for most consecutive completions in one game, above
 Div II: 23 – Mike Ganey, Allegheny, last 16 attempts vs. Carnegie Mellon, Oct. 9, 1967 and first seven attempts vs. Oberlin, Oct. 16, 1967
 Div III: 29 – Chris Edwards, Washington & Jefferson. last eight attempts vs. Hanover, Sep. 10, 2005 and first 21 attempts vs. Allegheny, Sep. 17, 2005

Receiving

Most receptions, career
 FBS: 399 – Zay Jones, East Carolina, 2013–16
 FCS: 428 – Cooper Kupp, Eastern Washington, 2013-16
 Div II: 386 – Justin Bernard, Saint Anselm College 2010–14
 Div III: 463 – Michael Zweifel, Wisconsin–River Falls and University of Dubuque, 2007–11

Most receptions, season
 FBS: 158 – Zay Jones, East Carolina, 2016
 FCS: 136 – Erik Lora, Eastern Illinois, 2012
 Div II: 143 – Nick Smart, Southwest Baptist, 2007
 Div III: 140 – Michael Zweifel, Dubuque (IA), 2011

Most receptions, game
 FBS: 23 – Tyler Jones, Eastern Michigan vs. Central Michigan, Nov. 28, 2008; Randy Gatewood, UNLV vs. Idaho, Sep. 17, 1994
 FCS: 24 – Chas Gessner, Brown vs. Rhode Island, Oct. 5, 2002; Jerry Rice, Mississippi Valley vs. Southern, Oct. 1, 1983
 Div II: 23 – Mitchell Shegos, Notre Dame (OH) vs. Glenville State, Oct. 25, 2014 ; Chris George, Glenville State vs. West Virginia Wesleyan, Oct. 15, 1994; Barry Wagner, Alabama A&M vs. Clark Atlanta, Nov. 4, 1989
 Div III: 25 – Daniel Passafiume, Hanover vs. Franklin, Nov. 15, 2009

Most consecutive games with a reception
 FBS: 54 – Bryan Anderson, Central Michigan, 2006–09
 FCS: 52 – Cooper Kupp, Eastern Washington, 2013–2016
 Div II: 50 – Mike Washington, West Chester, 2005–08
 Div III: 50 – Fritz Waldvogel, St. Thomas (MN), 2008–11

Most yards receiving, career
 FBS: 5,278 – Corey Davis, Western Michigan, 2013-16
 FCS: 6,464 – Cooper Kupp, Eastern Washington, 2013–16
 Div II: 4,983 – Clarence Coleman, Ferris State, 1998–2001
 Div III: 6,108 – Scott Pingel, Westminster (MO), 1996–99

Most yards receiving, season
 FBS: 2,060 – Trevor Insley, Nevada, 1999
 FCS: 1,850 – Brandon Kaufman, Eastern Washington, 2012
 Div II: 1,821 - Isaac Stonefield Glenville State, 2020
 Div III: 2,157 – Scott Pingel, Westminster (MO), 1998

Most yards receiving by a tight end, season
 FBS: 1,352 – Jace Amaro, Texas Tech, 2013 
 FCS:
 Div II: 
 Div III: 1,290 – Don Moehling, Wisconsin–Stevens Point, 1988

Most yards receiving, game
 FBS: 405 – Troy Edwards, Louisiana Tech vs. Nebraska, Aug. 29, 1998
 FCS: 376 – Kassim Osgood, Cal Poly vs. Northern Iowa, Nov. 4, 2000
 Div II: 425 – Trey McVay, Northeastern State vs. Harding, Oct. 15, 2011 
 Div III: 418 – Lewis Howes, Principia vs. Martin Luther, Oct. 12, 2002

Highest receiving yards per game, career
 FBS: 140.9 – Alex Van Dyke, Nevada, 1994–95
 FCS: 124.3 – Cooper Kupp, Eastern Washington, 2013–16
 Div II: 160.8 – Chris George, Glenville State, 1993–94
 Div III: 156.6 – Scott Pingel, Westminster (MO), 1996–99

Highest receiving yards per game, season
 FBS: 187.3 – Trevor Insley, Nevada, 1999
 FCS: 168.2 – Jerry Rice, Mississippi Valley, 1984
 Div II: 187.6 – Chris George, Glenville State, 1993
 Div III: 215.7 – Scott Pingel, Westminster (MO), 1998

Most games with 100 yards receiving, career
 FBS: 27 - Corey Davis, Western Michigan, 2013–16
 FCS: 29 – Cooper Kupp, Eastern Washington, 2013–16
 Div II: 30 - Patrick Ondis Briley, Langston, 82-85
 Div III:

Most receiving touchdowns, career
 FBS: 60 – Jarett Dillard, Rice, 2005–08
 FCS: 73 – Cooper Kupp, Eastern Washington, 2013–16
 Div II: 78 – Dallas Mall, Bentley, 2001–04
 Div III: 75 – Scott Pingel, Westminster (MO), 1996–99

Most receiving touchdowns, season
 FBS: 27 – Troy Edwards, Louisiana Tech, 1998
 FCS: 27 – Jerry Rice, Mississippi Valley, 1984
 Div II: 35 – David Kircus, Grand Valley State, 2002
 Div III: 26 – Jack Phelan, Hartwick, 2008; Scott Pingel, Westminster (MO), 1998

Most receiving touchdowns, game
 FBS: 7 – Rashaun Woods, Oklahoma State vs. SMU, Sep. 20, 2003
 FCS: 6 – Cos DeMatteo, Chattanooga vs. Mississippi Valley, Sep. 16, 2000
 Div II: 8 – Paul Zaeske, North Park vs. North Central (IL), Oct. 12, 1968
 Div III: 7 – Matt Perceval, Wesleyan (CT) vs. Middlebury, Sep. 26, 1998

Scoring

Most touchdowns responsible for, career
 FBS: 178 – Case Keenum, Houston, 2007–11
 FCS: 159 – Bruce Eugene, Grambling, 2001–05
 Div II: 162 – Tyson Bagent, Shepherd, 2018–22
 Div III: 168 – Justin Peery, Westminster (MO), 1996–99; Kevin Burke, Mount Union, 2011–14

Most touchdowns responsible for, season
 FBS: 65 – Joe Burrow, LSU, 2019; Bailey Zappe, Western Kentucky, 2021
 FCS: 71 Lindsey Scott Jr. UIW 2022
 Div II: 61 – Roland Rivers III, Slippery Rock, 2019
 Div III: 68 - Blaine Hawkins, Central (IA), 2021

Most touchdowns responsible for, game
 FBS: 11 – David Klingler, Houston vs. Eastern Washington, Nov. 17, 1990
 FCS: 10 – Ren Hefley, Presbyterian vs. St. Andrews, September 4, 2021
 Div II: 10 – Bruce Swanson, North Park vs. North Central (IL), Oct. 12, 1968
 Div III:

Most points responsible for, career
 FBS: 1,078 – Case Keenum, Houston, 2007–11
 FCS: 960 – Bruce Eugene, Grambling, 2001–05
 Div II: 966 – Jimmy Terwilliger, East Stroudsburg, 2003–06
 Div III:

Most points responsible for, season
 FBS: 394 – Bailey Zappe, Western Kentucky, 2021
 FCS: 368 – Willie Totten, Mississippi Valley, 1984
 Div II: 366 - Roland Rivers III, Slippery Rock, 2019
 Div III: 410 – Blaine Hawkins, Central (IA), 2021

Most points responsible for, game
 FBS: 66 – David Klingler, Houston vs. Eastern Washington, Nov. 17, 1990
 FCS: 64 – Ren Hefley, Presbyterian vs. St. Andrews, September 4, 2021

Most points scored by kicker, career
 FBS: 499 – Austin Seibert, Oklahoma, 2015–18
 FCS: 542 – Ethan Ratke, James Madison, 2017–21
 Div II: 420 – Jeff Glas, North Dakota, 2002–05
 Div III: 383 – Mike Zimmerman, Mount Union, 2005–07

Most points scored by kicker, season
 FBS: 157 – Roberto Aguayo, Florida State, 2013
 FCS: 127 – Julian Rauch, Appalachian State, 2007; Jon Striefsky, Delaware, 2007
 Div II: 138 – Jeff Glas, North Dakota, 2005
 Div III: 183 - Edward Ruhnke, Mount Union, 2014

Most points scored by kicker, game
 FBS: 24 – Mike Prindle, Western Michigan vs. Marshall, Sep. 29, 1984; Dominik Eberle, Utah State vs. New Mexico State, Sep. 8, 2018
 FCS: 24 – Goran Lingmerth, Northern Arizona vs. Idaho, Oct. 25, 1986
 Div II: 21 – Thomas Kopcho, Missouri Western State University vs. Northeastern State (OK), Oct. 16, 2021
 Div III: 20 – Jim Hever, Rhodes vs. Millsaps, Sep. 22, 1984

Most points scored by non-kicker, career
 FBS: 530 – Keenan Reynolds, Navy, 2012–15
 FCS: 544 – Brian Westbrook, Villanova, 1997–98, 2000–01
 Div II: 656 – Germaine Race, Pittsburg State, 2003–06
 Div III: 780 – Nate Kmic, Mount Union, 2005–08

Most points scored by non-kicker, season
 FBS: 236 – Montee Ball, Wisconsin, 2011
 FCS: 234 – Omar Cuff, Delaware, 2007
 Div II: 228 – Xavier Omon, Northwest Missouri State, 2007; Danny Woodhead, Chadron State, 2006
 Div III: 264 – Nate Kmic, Mount Union, 2008

Most points scored by non-kicker, game
 FBS: 48 – Howard Griffith, Illinois vs. Southern Illinois, September 22, 1990; Kalen Ballage, Arizona State vs. Texas Tech, September 10, 2016; Jaret Patterson, Buffalo vs. Kent State, November 28, 2020
 FCS: 42 – Omar Cuff, Delaware vs. William & Mary, Aug. 30, 2007; Jessie Burton, McNeese State vs. Southern Utah, Sep. 19, 1998; Archie Amerson, Northern Arizona vs. Weber State, Oct. 5, 1996
 Div II: 48 – Paul Zaeske, North Park vs. North Central (IL), Oct. 12, 1968; Junior Wolf, Oklahoma Panhandle vs. St. Mary (KS), Nov. 8, 1958
 Div III: 48 – Carey Bender, Coe vs. Beloit, Nov. 12, 1994

Defense

Interceptions

Most interceptions, career
 FBS: 29 – Al Brosky, Illinois, 1950–52
 FCS: 31 – Rashean Mathis, Bethune–Cookman, 1999–2003
 Div II: 37 – Tom Collins, Indianapolis, 1982–85
 Div III: 32  – Zach Autenrieb, Thomas More (KY) 2009–12

Most interceptions, season
 FBS: 14 – Al Worley, Washington, 1968; Gerod Holliman, Louisville, 2014
 FCS: 14 – Rashean Mathis, Bethune–Cookman, 2002
 Div II: 14 – Seven times. Most recent: Dan Peters, Shepherd, 2006
 Div III: 15 – Ben Matthews, Bethel (MN), 2000; Mark Dorner, Juniata, 1987

Most team interceptions, game
 FBS: 10* – Oklahoma St. vs. Detroit, Nov. 28, 1942; UCLA vs. California, Oct. 21, 1978

NCAA single game national record. 11 interceptions: St. Cloud State College vs Bemidji, Oct. 31, 1970. (5 by safety Bill Trewick, 3 by linebacker Mark Swedlund and 3 by safety Ted Lockett).

*The NCAA lists two different records for team interceptions in a game.  The listed record is for "Most passes intercepted by against a major-college opponent".
The unrestricted "Most passes intercepted by" is held by Brown, with 11, in a game versus Rhode Island, Oct. 8, 1949.

Most interceptions, game
 FBS: 5*† – 4 times: Lee Cook, Oklahoma St. vs. Detroit, Nov. 28, 1942; Walt Pastuszak, Brown vs. Rhode Island, Oct. 8, 1949; Byron Beaver, Houston vs. Baylor, Sep. 22, 1962; Dan Rebsch, Miami (OH) vs. Western Mich., Nov. 4, 1972
 FCS: 5 – 3 times: Mark Cordes, Eastern Washington vs. Boise State, Sep. 6, 1986; Michael Richardson, Northwestern State vs. Southeastern Louisiana, Nov. 12, 1983; Karl Johnson, Jackson State vs. Grambling, Oct. 23, 1982

NCAA National record: 5 interceptions by Bill Trewick, St. Cloud State vs. Bemidji, Oct. 31, 1970.

Gary Evans, Truman vs. Missouri S&T, Oct. 18, 1975.
 Div III: 5 – 11 times. Most recent: James Patrick, Stillman vs. Edward Waters, Nov. 2, 2002 Eric Gargiulo Montclair State University vs Southern Virginia 10/10/2014

*The NCAA record book includes a special note about 6 interceptions by Dick Miller (Akron) versus Baldwin-Wallace on 
Oct. 23, 1937 before the collection of division records.

†Tulane University lists 5 interceptions by Mitchell Price in a game versus Tennessee–Chattanooga September 3, 1988 which is not recognized as an official statistic by the NCAA.

Consecutive games with an interception
 FBS: 15 – Al Brosky, Illinois, Nov. 11, 1950 to Oct. 18, 1952
 FCS: 8 – Jamar Williams, Morgan State University, 1998–2001
FCS: 8 - Justin Ford, University of Montana, 2021
 Div II: 8 – Darin Nix, Missouri S&T, 1993–94
 Div III: 9 – Brent Sands, Cornell College, 1992

Most interceptions returned for a touchdown, career
 FBS: 6 – Emmanuel Forbes, Mississippi State, 2020–22
 FCS: 6 – William Hampton, Murray State, 1993–96, Marcus Williams, North Dakota State 2010–13
 Div II: 
 Div III:

Most interceptions returned for a touchdown, season
 FBS: 4 – Deltha O'Neal, California, 1999
 FCS: 4 – William Hampton, Murray State, 1995; Joseph Vaughn, Cal State Northridge, 1994; Robert Turner, Jackson State, 1990
 Div II: 4 – Stevie Harden, Valdosta State, 2010; Quintez Smith, Shaw, 2009; Clay Blalack, UT Martin, 1976
 Div III: 4 – Phil Terio, Salve Regina, 2012

Most interceptions returned for a touchdown, game
 FBS: 3 – Johnnie Jackson, Houston vs. Texas, Nov. 7, 1987
 FCS: 2 – 23 times. Most recent: Jeffrey Smyth, Presbyterian College vs. Stetson University, Apr. 3, 2021
 Div II: 
 Div III: 3 – Many times.

Most interception return yards, career
 FBS: 501 – Terrell Buckley, Florida State, 1989–91
 FCS: 682 – Rashean Mathis, Bethune–Cookman, 1999–2002
 Div II: 528 – Pierre Thomas, Missouri Western State, 2000–03
 Div III: 448 – Todd Schoelzel, Wisconsin–Oshkosh, 1985–88

Most interception return yards, season
 FBS: 302 – Charles Phillips, Southern California, 1974
 FCS: 455 – Rashean Mathis, Bethune–Cookman, 2002
 Div II: 362 – Pierre Thomas, Missouri Western State, 2003
 Div III: 358 – Rod Pesek, Whittier, 1987

Most interception return yards, game
 FBS: 182 – Ashley Lee, Virginia Tech vs. Vanderbilt, Nov. 12, 1983
 FCS: 216 – Keiron Bigby, Brown vs. Yale, Sep. 29, 1984
 Div II: 194 – Quintez Smith, Shaw vs. Elizabeth City State, Aug. 29, 2009
 Div III: 164 – Rick Conner, McDaniel vs. Dickinson, Oct. 15, 1983

Tackles
Since the 1960 season

Most tackles, career

 FBS: 694 - John Offerdahl, Western Michigan, 1982-85
 FCS: 580 - Boomer Grigsby, Illinois State, 2001–04
 Div II: 633 – Connor Harris, Lindenwood, 2012–16
 Div III: 712 – Keith LaDu, Oberlin, 1984-87

Highest tackles per game average, career
 FBS: 15.00 - Rick Razzano, Virginia Tech, 1974-1977
 FCS: 13.2 – Josh Cain, Chattanooga, 2000–02
 Div II: 16.00 - Kevin Kilroy, Missouri Western, 1993-19961
 Div III: 15.1 - Ryan Slager Grinnell, 2015-18

Most tackles, season
 FBS: 198* – Kevin McLain, Colorado State, 1975
 FCS: 195 – Kevin Talley, Norfolk State, 2003
 Div II: 169 – B. J. Russell, Mesa State, 2004
 Div III: 201 – Keith LaDu, Oberlin, 1986

*Mike Singletary (Baylor) Recorded 232 tackles in 1978 but the NCAA did not begin collecting defensive statistics until 2000

Highest tackles per game average, season
 FBS: 15.92* – Luke Kuechly, Boston College, 2011
 FCS: 16.3 – Boomer Grigsby, Illinois State, 2002; Kevin Talley, Norfolk State, 2003
 Div II: 15.9 – Allen Minus, Lincoln (MO), 2004
 Div III: 19.8 – Kyle McGivney, Luther, 2010

*Joe Norman (Indiana) recorded 199 tackles in 11 games in 1978 for an 18.09 average, but the NCAA did not begin collecting defensive statistics until 2000.

Most tackles, game
 FBS: 30* – Rick Razzano, Virginia Tech vs, Kentucky, Sep. 15, 1977
 FCS: 31 – Ryan Greenhagen, Fordham vs. Nebraska, Sep. 4, 2021
 Div II: 30 - Kevin Kilroy, Missouri Western vs. Northwest Missouri, September 17, 1994
 Div II: 30** – Shaun Maloney, Minnesota–Morris vs. Minnesota State Moorhead, Oct. 27, 2001
 Div III: 31 – Keith LaDu, Oberlin vs. Marietta, 1985

 Mike Singletary (Baylor) recorded 35 tackles against Houston and 33 tackles against Arkansas in 1978, but the NCAA did not begin collecting defensive statistics until 2000 
 Lee Roy Jordan (Alabama) recorded 31 tackles against Oklahoma in the 1962 Orange Bowl, but the NCAA did not begin collecting defensive statistics until 2000
 Larry Mertz (Kutztown) recorded 31 tackles against Clarion on November 22, 1980, but the NCAA did not begin collecting defensive statistics until 2000

Most solo tackles, career
 FBS: 360 – Rod Davis, Southern Miss., 2000–03
 FCS: 325 – Boomer Grigsby, Illinois State, 2001–04
 Div II: 323 – Connor Harris, Lindenwood, 2012–16
 Div III: 302 – Kyle Follweiler, Wilkes, 2004–07

Highest solo tackles per game average, career
 FBS: 8.80 – E. J. Henderson, Maryland, 2000–02
 FCS: 8.00 – Josh Cain, Chattanooga, 2000–02
 Div II: 9.2 - Kevin Kilroy, Missouri Western, 1993-1996
 Div III: 7.35 – Casey McConnell, Kenyon, 2001–03

Most solo tackles, season
 FBS: 135* – E. J. Henderson, Maryland, 2002
 FCS: 113 – Josh Cain, Chattanooga, 2002
 Div II: 97 – Tyke Kozeal, University of Nebraska-Kearney, 2016
 Div III: 106 – Robert Gunn, Earlham, 2000

*Joe Norman (Indiana) recorded 141 solo tackles in 1978, but the NCAA did not begin collecting defensive statistics until 2000.

Highest solo tackles per game average, season
 FBS: 10.20* – Rick Sherrod, West Virginia, 2001
 FCS: 9.82 – Boomer Grigsby, Illinois State, 2002
 Div II: 8.81 – Tyke Kozeal, Nebraska–Kearney, 2016
 Div III: 10.6 – Robert Gunn, Earlham, 2000

*Joe Norman (Indiana) recorded 141 solo tackles in 11 games in 1978 for a 12.81 average, but the NCAA did not begin collecting defensive statistics until 2000.

Most solo tackles, game
 FBS: 20 – Tyrell Johnson, Arkansas State vs. North Texas, Nov. 26, 2005
 FCS: 21 – Dan Adams, Holy Cross, Oct. 22, 2005
 Div II: 19 – Eric Portley, Fayetteville State vs. N.C. Central, Oct. 8, 2005
 Div III: 21 – Tim Rotenberry, North Park vs. Millikin, Oct. 16, 2004; Ryan Martin, Hanover College vs. Anderson (IN), Oct. 17, 2015

Most tackles for loss, career
 FBS: 75 – Khalil Mack, Buffalo, 2010–13, Jason Babin, Western Michigan, 2000–03
 FCS: 80 – James Cowser, Southern Utah, 2012-15 
 Div II: 92.5 – Marcus Martin, Slippery Rock, 2014-2017
 Div III: 106½ – Steven Wilson, King's (PA), 2000–02

Highest tackles for loss per game average, career
 FBS: 1.92 – Sammy Brown, Houston, 2010-11
 FCS: 2.48 – Steve Baggs, Bethune-Cookman, 2002-03
 Div II: 2.58 – Charlie Cook, C.W. Post, 2000-01
 Div III: 3.33 – Steven Wilson, King’s (PA), 2000-02

Most tackles for loss, season
 FBS: 39 – Derrick Thomas, Alabama, 1988 2019 Football Record Book (PDF)
 FCS: 36 – Steve Baggs, Bethune–Cookman, 2003
 Div II: 37 – Charlie Cook, C. W. Post, 2001
 Div III: 39 – Steven Wilson, King's (PA), 2002

Highest tackles for loss per game average, season
 FBS: 2.77 – Kenny Philpot, Eastern Michigan, 2001
 FCS: 3.00 – Steve Baggs, Bethune–Cookman, 2003
 Div II: 3.1 – Charlie Cook, C.W. Post, 2001
 Div III: 3.9 – Steven Wilson, King’s (PA), 2001

Most tackles for loss, game
 FBS: 8 – Nate Irving, North Carolina State vs. Wake Forest, Nov. 13, 2010
 FCS: 8 – Sherrod Coates, Western Kentucky vs. Indiana State, Oct. 26, 2002
 Div II: 9 – Darryl Wilson, Concord vs. West Virginia State, Oct. 8, 2005; Ron Ellington, Catawba vs. Mars Hill, Oct. 1, 2005
 Div III: 9½ – Ernest Wiggins, Husson vs. SUNY Maritime, Oct. 27, 2012

Most sacks, career
 FBS: 46* – Terrell Suggs, Arizona State, 2000–02, Javon Rolland-Jones, Arkansas State, 2014–17
 FCS: 59 – James Cowser, Southern Utah, 2012–15 
 Div II: 56 – Marcus Martin, Slippery Rock, 2014–17
 Div III: 53½ – Mike Czerwien, Waynesburg, 2002–04

*Derrick Thomas (Alabama) and Tedy Bruschi (Arizona) each recorded 52 sacks, and Bruce Smith (Virginia Tech) recorded 46, but the NCAA did not start collecting official defensive statistics until 2000.

Hugh Green – University of Pittsburgh 53 career sacks 77-80

Highest sacks per game average, career
 FBS: 1.61 – Dwight Freeney, Syracuse, 2000–01
 FCS: 1.26 – Robert Mathis, Alabama A&M, 2000–02
 Div II: 1.42 – Charlie Cook, C.W. Post, 2000–01
 Div III: 1.53 – Steven Wilson, King's (PA), 2000–02

Most sacks, season
 FBS: 24*– Terrell Suggs, Arizona State, 2002
 FCS: 21 – Chris McNeil, North Carolina A&T State, 1997
 Div II: 25.5 – Caleb Murphy, Ferris State University 2022
 Div III: 24 – Russ Watson, Worcester State, 2000

*Derrick Thomas (Alabama) recorded 27 sacks in 1988, but the NCAA did not start collecting official defensive statistics until 2000.

Highest sacks per game average, season
 FBS: 1.71 – Terrell Suggs, Arizona State, 2002
 FCS: 1.89 – Andrew Hollingsworth, Towson, 2000
 Div II: 1.8 – Damien Gilyard, C.W. Post, 2004
 Div III: 2.7 – Russ Watson, Worcester State, 2000

Most sacks, game
 FBS: 6* – Ameer Ismail, Western Michigan vs. Ball State, Oct. 21, 2006; Elvis Dumervil, Louisville vs. Kentucky, Sep. 4, 2005; Felix Anudike-Uzomah, Kansas State vs. TCU, October 30, 2021
 FCS: 6 – Damien Huren, Southeastern Louisiana vs. Northern Colorado, Oct. 9, 2004; Pat Dowd, University of Dayton vs. Drake University, Nov. 9, 2013
 Div II: 7 – Ron Ellington, Catawba vs. Mars Hill, Oct. 1, 2005
 Div III: 7½ – Kevin McNamara, St. John's (MN) vs. Monmouth (IL), Nov. 19, 2005
*Shay Muirbrook (BYU) recorded 6 sacks in the 1997 Cotton Bowl, but the NCAA did not start collecting official defensive statistics until 2000 and does not recognize bowl game statistics for any category prior to 2002.

Special teams

Punting

Most punts, career
 FBS: 337 – Alex Kinal, Wake Forest, 2012–15
 FCS: 301 – Barry Bowman, Louisiana Tech, 1983–86
 Div II: 328 – Dan Brown, Nicholls State, 1976–79
 Div III: 280 – Mark Diedrichsen, Rowan, 2013–16

Most punts, season
 FBS: 101 – Jim Bailey, VMI, 1969
 FCS: 117 – Tony Epperson, Weber State University, 2013
 Div II: 98 – John Tassi, Lincoln (MO), 1981
 Div III: 106 – Bob Blake, Wisconsin–Superior, 1977

Most punts, game
 FBS: 26 – Charlie Calhoun, Texas Tech vs. Centenary (LA), Nov. 11, 1939
 FCS: 16 – Matt Stover, Louisiana Tech vs. Louisiana–Monroe, Nov. 18, 1988
 Div II: 32 – Jan Jones, Sam Houston State vs. Texas A&M–Commerce, Nov. 2, 1946
 Div III: 17 – Jerry Williams, Frostburg State vs. Salisbury, Sep. 30, 1978

Highest punting average, career
 FBS: 46.3 – Todd Sauerbrun, West Virginia, 1991–94 (150–199 punts); 47.8 – Ryan Stonehouse, Colorado State, 2017–21 (200–249 punts); 45.2 – Daniel Sepulveda, Baylor, 2003–06 (min. 250 punts)
 FCS: 44.8 – Mark Gould, Northern Arizona, 2000–03 (min. 150 punts)
 Div II: 44.9 – Jeff Williams, Adams State, 2002–05 (min. 100 punts)
 Div III: 43.4 – Jeff Shea, Cal Lutheran, 1994–97 (min. 100 punts)

Highest punting average, season
 FBS: 51.19 – Matt Araiza, San Diego State, 2021 (min. 35 punts)
 FCS: 48.2 – Mark Gould, Northern Arizona, 2002 (min. 60 punts)
 Div II: 49.1 – Steve Ecker, Shippensburg, 1965 (min. 20 punts); 48.0 – Jeff Williams, Adams State, 2004 (min. 40 punts)
 Div III: 46.2 – Ryan Anderson, Olivet, 2016 (min. 40 punts)

Highest punting average, game
 FBS: 60.8 - Braden Mann, Texas A&M vs. Alabama, Sep. 22, 2018 (5–9 punts); 53.6 – Jim Benien, Oklahoma State vs. Colorado, Nov. 13, 1971 (min. 10 punts)
 FCS: 61.5 – Eddie Johnson, Idaho State vs. Cal Poly, Nov. 16, 2002 (5–9 punts); 52.2 – Stuart Dodds, Montana State vs. Northern Arizona, Oct. 20, 1979 (min. 10 punts)
 Div II: 57.5 – Tim Baer, Colorado Mines vs. Fort Lewis, Oct. 25, 1986 (min. 5 punts)
 Div III: 58.4 - Danny Breslow, Kumeyaay vs. Tierrasanta, Nov. 1, 1999 (min. 6 punts)

Most punting yards, career
 FBS: 13,911 – Alex Kinal, Wake Forest, 2012–15
 FCS:
 Div II: 10,780 - Jeff Williams, Adams State, 2002–2005 (min. 200 punts)
 Div III: 8,531 - Nick Firth, Kean, 2018-2022

Most punting yards, season
 FBS: 4,138 – Johnny Pingel, Michigan State, 1938
 FCS:
 Div II: 3,686 - Luke Jones, New Mexico Highlands, 2016 (min. 70 punts)
 Div III: 4,026 - Danny Breslow, DePortola, 2002

Most punting yards, game
 FBS: 1,318 – Charlie Calhoun, Texas Tech vs. Centenary (LA) Nov. 11, 1939
 FCS:
 Div II:
 Div III: 336 - Drew Shipley, Minnesota Morris vs. UW River Falls

Longest punt
 FBS: 99 – Pat Brady, Nevada vs. Loyola Marymount, 1950
 FCS: 93 – Tyler Grogan, Northeastern vs. Villanova, September 8, 2001
 Div II: 97 – Earl Hurst, Emporia State. vs. Central Missouri, October 3, 1964
 Div III: 95 – Austin Baker, Hiedelberg University vs. John Carroll University, November 3, 2018

Punt returns

Highest average gain per return, career
Minimum of 1.2 returns per game
 FBS: 23.6 – Jack Mitchell, Oklahoma, 1946–48 (39 for 922)
 FCS: 17.7 – LeRoy Vann, Florida A&M, 2006–09
 Div II: 26.2 – Billy Johnson, Widener, 1971–72
 Div III: 22.9 – Keith Winston, Knoxville, 1986–87

Highest average gain per return, season
Minimum of 1.2 returns per game
 FBS: 28.5 – Maurice Jones-Drew, UCLA, 2005
 FCS: 26.5 – Curtis DeLoatch, North Carolina A&T, 2001
 Div II: 34.1 – Billy Johnson, Widener, 1972
 Div III: 31.2 – Chuck Downey, Stony Brook, 1986

Highest average gain per return, game
 FBS: 43.8 – Golden Richards, BYU vs. Texas, September 10, 1971 (min. 5 returns)
 FCS: 43.2 – Ricky Pearsall, Northern Arizona vs. Western New Mexico, August 29, 1996 (min. 5 returns)
 Div II: 66.3 – Billy Johnson, Widener vs. St. John's (NY), September 23, 1972 (min. 4 returns)
 Div III:

Most punts returned, career
 FBS: 153 – Vai Sikahema, BYU, 1980–82, 1984–85
 FCS: 143 – Levander Segars, Montana, 2001–04
 Div II: 153 – Armin Anderson, UC Davis, 1983–85
 Div III: 134 – Marvin Deal, McDaniel, 1996–99

Most punts returned, game
 FBS: 20 – Milton Hill, Texas Tech vs. Centenary (LA), November 11, 1939
 FCS: 11 – Peter Athans, Sacred Heart vs. Siena, November 9, 2002
 Div II: 12 – David Nelson, Ferris State vs. Northern Michigan, October 2, 1993
 Div III: 10 – Ellis Wangelin, Wisconsin–River Falls vs. Wisconsin–Platteville, October 12, 1985

Most punts returned, season
 FBS: 57 – Wes Welker, Texas Tech, 2002
 FCS: 55 – Tommy Houk, Murray State, 1980
 Div II: 61 – Armin Anderson, UC Davis, 1984
 Div III: 48 – Rick Bealer, Lycoming, 1989

Most yards on punt returns, career 
 FBS: 1,762 – Wes Welker, Texas Tech, 2000–03
 FCS: 1,668 – Marquay McDaniel, Hampton, 2002–05
 Div II: 1,760 – Anthony Merritt, North Alabama, 2003–06
 Div III: 1,550 – Joshua Carter, Muhlenberg, 1998–2001

Most yards on punt returns, season
 FBS: 791 – Lee Nalley, Vanderbilt, 1948
 FCS: 698 – Khris Gardin, North Carolina A&T, 2015
 Div II: 670 – Travis Lueck, North Dakota, 2003
 Div III: 688 – Melvin Dillard, Ferrum, 1990

Most yards on punt returns, game
 FBS: 277 – Antonio Perkins, Oklahoma vs. UCLA, Sep. 20, 2003
 FCS: 227 – Leonard Goolsby, South Carolina State vs. Norfolk State, Oct. 11, 2003
 Div II: 265 – Billy Johnson, Widener vs. St. John's (NY), Sep. 23, 1972
 Div III: 278 – P. J. Williams, Mary Hardin–Baylor vs. Mississippi College, Oct. 1, 2005

Most touchdowns scored on punt returns, career
 FBS: 9 — Dante Pettis, Washington, 2014–17 
 FCS: 8 – LeRoy Vann, Florida A&M, 2006–09
 Div II: 10 – James Rooths, Shepherd, 1997–2000
 Div III: 7 – Chuck Downey, Stony Brook, 1984–87

Most touchdowns scored on punt returns, season
 FBS: 6 - Ryan Switzer, North Carolina, 2013; Chad Owens, Hawaii, 2004
 FCS: 5 – LeRoy Vann, Florida A&M, 2009; Curtis DeLoatch, North Carolina A&T, 2001
 Div II: 5 – James Rooths, Shepherd, 1998
 Div III: 5 – Chris McKinney, Guilford, 2001

Most touchdowns scored on punt returns, game
 FBS: 3 – Antonio Perkins, Oklahoma vs. UCLA, Sep. 20, 2003
 FCS: 3 – Zuriel Smith, Hampton vs. Virginia State, Sep. 22, 2001; Aaron Fix, Canisius vs. Siena, Sep. 24, 1994
 Div II: 3 – Virgil Seay, Troy vs. West Alabama, Sep. 29, 1979; Billy Johnson, Widener vs. St. John's (NY), Sep. 23, 1972; Bobby Ahu, Hawaii vs. Linfield, Nov. 15, 1969; Tom Shockley, Adams State vs. Colo Mines, Nov. 14, 1970
 Div III: 3 – John Conroy, Otterbein vs. Heidelberg, Nov. 1, 2003

Kickoff returns

Highest average gain per return, career
Minimum 1.2 returns per game
 FBS: 35.1 – Anthony Davis, USC, 1972-74
 FCS: 30.5 – Scotty McGee, James Madison, 2006–09
 Div II: 34.0 – Glen Printers, Colorado State–Pueblo, 1973–74
 Div III: 34.2 – Darnell Williams, Louisiana College, 2010–11

Highest average gain per return, season
Minimum 1.2 returns per game
 FBS: 42.5 – Anthony Davis, USC, 1974
 FCS: 37.3 – David Fraterrigo, Canisius, 1993
 Div II: 41.7 – Richard Medlin, Fayetteville State, 2008
 Div III: 48.5 – Darnell Williams, Louisiana College, 2010

Most kickoff returns, career
 FBS: 144 – Troy Stoudermire, Minnesota, 2009–12
 FCS: 191 – Terrence Holt, Austin Peay, 2007–10
 Div II: 133 – Zack Page, Fairmont State, 2007–10
 Div III: 132 – Chris Schubert, Oberlin, 2004–07

Most kickoff returns, season
 FBS: 75 – Isaiah Burse, Fresno State, 2011
 FCS: 52 – Terrence Holt, Austin Peay, 2009
 Div II: 49 – Jason Washington, Pace, 2010
 Div III: 54 – Jake Wilson, Allegheny, 2016

Most kickoff returns, game
 FBS: 12 – Victor Bolden, Oregon State vs. Washington, Nov. 23, 2013
 FCS: 12 – Eric Slenk, Valparaiso vs. Jacksonville, Oct. 16, 2010
 Div II: 12 – Johnny Cox, Fort Lewis vs. Mesa State, Nov. 3, 1990
 Div III: 14 – Arlie Myers, Nebraska Wesleyan vs. Morningside, Sep. 12, 2015

Most yards on kickoff returns, career
 FBS: 3,615 – Troy Stoudermire, Minnesota, 2009–12
 FCS: 4,683 – Terrence Holt, Austin Peay, 2007–10
 Div II: 3,265 – Zack Page, Fairmont State, 2007–10
 Div III: 2,867 – Chris Schubert, Oberlin, 2004–07

Most yards on kickoff returns, season
 FBS: 1,606 – Isaiah Burse, Fresno State, 2011
 FCS: 1,411 – David Primus, Samford, 1989
 Div II: 1,234 – Justin Gallas, Colorado Mines, 2005
 Div III: 1,268 – Jake Wilson, Allegheny, 2016

Most yards on kickoff returns, game
 FBS: 319 – Leonard Johnson, Iowa State vs. Oklahoma State, Nov. 1, 2008
 FCS: 333 – Colby Goodwyn, Old Dominion vs. Cal Poly, Oct. 9, 2010
 Div II: 304 – L. J. McCray, Catawba vs. Tusculum, Nov. 6, 2010
 Div III: 334 – Rashad Sims, Millsaps vs. East Texas Baptist, Sep. 27, 2014

Most touchdowns on kickoff returns, career
 FBS: 7 – C. J. Spiller, Clemson, 2006–09; Tyron Carrier, Houston, 2008–11; Rashaad Penny, San Diego State University, 2014–17; Tony Pollard, Memphis, 2016–18
 FCS: 6 – Jerome Mathis, Hampton, 2001–04
 Div II: 10– Stephan Neville, Stonehill, 2008–11; Dave Ludy, Winona State, 1991–94
 Div III: 10 – Larry Beavers, Wesley, 2004–05, 2007–08

Most touchdowns on kickoff returns, season
 FBS: 5 – Ashlan Davis, Tulsa, 2004
 FCS: 5 – Jerome Mathis, Hampton, 2004
 Div II: 4 – Stephan Neville, Stonehill, 2010; Andrew Jackson, Merrimack, 2005
 Div III: 5 – Larry Beavers, Wesley, 2008

Most touchdowns on kickoff returns, game
 FBS: 2 – 22 times. Most recent: Brian Battie, South Florida vs. Houston, Nov. 6, 2021
 FCS: 3 – Bashir Levingston, Eastern Washington vs. Sacramento State, Oct. 31, 1998
 Div II: 2 – Seven times. Most recent: L. J. McCray, Catawba vs. Tusculum, Nov. 6, 2010
 Div III: 2 – Many times. Most recent: Jamal Watkins, Birmingham–Southern vs. Huntingdon College, Sep. 12, 2015

Most touchdowns scored on combined kick returns, career
Minimum one punt return and one kickoff return

 FBS: 9 – Avery Williams, Boise State, 2017–20; Marcus Jones, Troy/Houston, 2017–21
 Div II: 11 – Stephan Neville, Stonehill, 2008–11; Deante Steele, Shepherd, 2007–10
 Div III: 13 – Larry Beavers, Wesley, 2004–05, 07–08

Field goals

Highest percentage of field goals made, career
 FBS: 89.5% – Alex Henery, Nebraska, 2007–10 (min. 55 attempts)
 FCS: 82.0% – Juan Toro, Florida A&M, 1995–98 (min. 50 attempts)
 Div II: 80.8% – Jessup Pfeifer, Nebraska–Kearney, 2003–06 (min. 35 made)
 Div III: 78.9% – Jeff Schebler, Wisconsin–Whitewater, 2006–09 (min. 50 attempts)

Most field goals made, career
 FBS: 96 – Zane Gonzalez, Arizona State, 2013–16
 FCS:  100 – Ethan Ratke, James Madison, 2016-22
 Div II: 82 – Jeff Glas, North Dakota, 2002–05
 Div III: 75 – Jeff Schebler, Wisconsin–Whitewater, 2006–09

Most field goals made, season
 FBS: 31 – Billy Bennett, Georgia, 2003
 FCS: 29 – Adam Keller, North Dakota State, 2015
 Div II: 30 – Jeff Glas, North Dakota, 2005
 Div III: 27 – Edward Ruhnke, Mount Union, 2014

Most field goals made, game
 FBS: 7 – Dale Klein, Nebraska vs. Missouri, Oct. 19, 1985; Mike Prindle, Western Michigan vs. Marshall, Sep. 29, 1984
 FCS: 8 – Goran Lingmerth, Northern Arizona vs. Idaho, Oct. 25, 1986
 Div II: 6 – Austin Wellock, Ashland vs. Wayne State (MI), Oct. 5, 2002; Steve Huff, Central Missouri. vs. Southeast Missouri State, Nov. 2, 1985; Cole Tracy, Assumption vs. LIU Post, Sep. 12, 2015; 
Cole Tracy, Assumption vs. St. Anselm, Oct. 14, 2016
 Div III: 6 – Jim Hever, Rhodes vs. Millsaps, Sep. 22, 1984

Most consecutive field goals made, career
 FBS: 34 – Nick Sciba, Wake Forest, 2018-2019
 FCS: 26 – Brian Mitchell, Northern Iowa, 1990–91
 Div II: 26 – Ryne Smith, West Alabama, 2011–12; Will Rhody, Valdosta State, 2004
 Div III:

Most consecutive field goals made, season
 FBS: 25 – Chuck Nelson, Washington, 1982
 FCS: 27 - Alex Thompson, Cal Poly, 2009
 Div II: 19--Ryne Smith West Alabama 2010-2011 19 - Will Rhody, Valdosta State, 2004
 Div III:

Longest field goal made
 FBS (with tee): 67 – Russell Erxleben, Texas vs. Rice, Oct. 1, 1977; Steve Little, Arkansas vs. Texas, Oct. 15, 1977; Joe Williams, Wichita State vs. Southern Illinois, Oct. 21, 1978
 FBS (without tee): 65 – Martín Gramática, Kansas State vs. Northern Illinois, Sept. 12, 1998
 FCS: 63 – Scott Roper, Arkansas State vs. North Texas, Nov. 7, 1987; Tim Foley, Georgia Southern vs. James Madison, Nov. 7, 1987; Bill Gramática, South Florida vs. Austin Peay, Nov. 18, 2000
 Div II: 67 – Tom Odle, Fort Hays State vs. Washburn, Nov. 5, 1988
 Div III: 62 – Dom Antonini, Rowan vs. Salisbury, Sep. 18, 1976; Matthew Aven, Claremont-Mudd-Scripps vs. California Lutheran University, Oct. 19, 2013
Note: The longest field goal ever made in collegiate competition was 69 yards by Ove Johansson of Abilene Christian University, which at the time (1976) was competing as an NAIA, not an NCAA, school.

NCAA players drafted into NFL by position
Among all colleges and universities, the following NCAA teams have the most players to reach the NFL by position:
Quarterbacks: USC (17)
Running backs: Nebraska (40)
Wide receivers: University of Miami and USC (tied at 40 each)
Tight ends: Notre Dame (21)
Offensive linemen: Notre Dame (63)
Defensive linemen: University of Miami (49)
Linebackers: Penn State (58)
Defensive backs: Ohio State (53)

References

Lists of college football individual records
Foot
Rec
College sports records and statistics in the United States